Jo Case is a writer and editor based in Adelaide, Australia. She was born in South Australia in 1975.

Career 
Case has served as senior writer and editor at the Wheeler Centre, an institution dedicated to the discussion and practice of writing and ideas, Program Manager of Melbourne Writers Festival (2015 and 2016), and as Books Editor for  The Big Issue (Australia).

Case's first book, Boomer and Me: A memoir of motherhood, and Asperger’s was published by Hardie Grant in Australia in April 2013, and in the United Kingdom in May 2013. She is a founding member of the editorial team of Kill Your Darlings, an Australian literary journal. Case writes about the process of writing a memoir on her blog.

Case's short story "Hell is Other Parents," originally published in The Sleepers Almanac, was selected for The Best Australian Stories 2009, edited by Delia Falconer.

Bibliography

Memoirs

Short fiction

Book reviews

References

Further reading 

Fiona Gruber, "Mothers Discuss Asperger's", The Age, 13 July 2013. http://www.theage.com.au/entertainment/books/mothers-discuss-aspergers-20130711-2psyp.html
 James Tierney, "Review of Boomer & Me: A Memoir of Motherhood, and Asperger’s by Jo Case", The Newtown Review of Books, 23 April 2013. http://newtownreviewofbooks.com/2013/04/23/jo-case-boomer-me-a-memoir-of-motherhood-and-aspergers-reviewed-by-james-tierney/

1975 births
Living people
Australian Book Review people
21st-century Australian women writers